The LGBT community in London is one of the largest within Europe. LGBT culture of London, England, is centred on Old Compton Street in Soho. There are also LGBT pubs and restaurants across London in Haggerston, Dalston and Vauxhall.

History
In the 18th century, some businesspersons and aristocrats had, for the time, relatively open LGBT lifestyles. Rictor Norton, author of Mother Clap's Molly House: The Gay Subculture in England, 1700–1830 stated that in the 1720s London had more gay pubs and clubs than it did in 1950. LGBT studies pre-1920s were entirely of males caught in scandals.

Homosexuality was decriminalised in England and Wales in 1967, but London was an LGBT tourism destination even before then. LGBT culture became more visible during the 1970s as a result of civil rights movements. Mark W. Turner, the author of "Gay London," stated that when Derek Jarman moved to Charing Cross in 1979, it began the process of Soho becoming the centre of the London LGBT community and that by the early 1990s this was "firmly established".

The Gateways Club was the longest running lesbian nightclub in the world, opening in 1936 and closing in 1985.

The Admiral Duncan pub in Soho was bombed on 30 April 1999. Newspaper articles stated the belief that the bombing was intended to attack the LGBT community; no persons who died in the incident were members of the local LGBT community.

Switchboard, formerly the London Lesbian and Gay Switchboard, is based in the capital, although it serves the whole country.

London's 2015 LGBT Pride Parade through the streets of London attracted over one million people.

Recreation
The Greater London Authority government promotes LGBT tourism.

The Above the Stag Theatre in Vauxhall is the UK's only LGBT-centric theatre.

Summer Rites is an LGBT-centric outdoor party. The London Pride Parade and the London Lesbian and Gay Film Festival are also held in the city.

Heaven is the largest gay disco club in Europe. It opened in 1979.

The UK's first gay and lesbian bookshop, Gay's the Word, is in Bloomsbury.

The WayOut Club is London's longest running club night for transgender women.

Notable residents
Those identifying as LGBT:
Marc Almond
Pete Burns
Alan Carr
Samantha Fox
 Stephen Fry
Boy George
 Derek Jarman
 Ian McKellen
Sakima
Graham Norton
Tom Daley
Dustin Lance Black
Paul O’Grady
Will Young
Peter Tatchell
Oscar Wilde (1854-1900)
Alan Turing (1912-1954)
Freddie Mercury (1946-1991)
George Michael (1963-2016)
Virginia Woolf (1882-1941)
Other persons:
 Margaret Clap – operated a Molly house

See also
 LGBT culture

Notes

References
 Thomas, Ardel. "London." Reader's Guide to Lesbian and Gay Studies. Routledge, 18 October 2013. , 9781135942410, or 113594234X, 9781135942342. p. 363-364. – A listing of academic works discussing the London LGBT community
 Turner, Mark W. "Gay London." In: Kerr, Joe and Andrew Gibson (editors). London From Punk to Blair: Revised Second Edition. Reaktion Books, 1 June 2013. , 9781780230757. Start p. 50.

Further reading
 Cooper, Davina. Sexing the City: Lesbian and Gay Politics within the Activist State. Rivers Oram (London) and Paul (Concord, Massachusetts), 1994. – Most of the book discusses the LGBT community of London
 Graham, Hugh, John Shandy Watson, and Paul Burston (editors). Time Out Gay and Lesbian London. Time Out Guides, 2010. , 9781905042562.
 Green, Sarah F. Urban Amazons: Lesbian Feminism and beyond in the Gender, Sexuality, and Identity Battles of London. St. Martins (New York), and Macmillan (Basingstroke, Hants), 1997.
 Lucas, Ian. Impertinent Decorum: Gay Theatrical Manoeuvers. Cassel (London and New York), 1994. – Discusses the LGBT culture in London theatre
 Norton, Rictor. Mother Clap's Molly House: The Gay Subculture in England, 1700–1830. Gay Men's Press (London) and Inbook (East Haven, Connecticut), 1992: Discusses "Molly houses" in and near London.
 Weeks, Jeffrey. Coming Out: Homosexual Politics in Britain from the Nineteenth Century to the Present. Quartet (London and New York): 1977. Revised edition: Quartet (London), 1990. – This book is not focused on London in particular; Arden Thomas stated that even so, the book makes it clear that LGBT-related laws were created in London
 Wilson, Olivette Cole and Clarence Allen, "The Black Perspective." In: Healey, Emma and Angela Mason (editors). Stonewall 25: The Making of the Lesbian and Gay Community of Britain. Virago (London), 1994 – Discusses the London black LGBT community

External links
 London Lesbian & Gay Switchboard (LLGS)

 
Culture in London
London
London